Weakland is a surname, being an Americanized form of the German surname Wickland. Notable people with the surname include:

 John Weakland (1919–1995), American psychotherapist
 Rembert Weakland (1927–2022), American monk and archbishop

See also
 Wickland (disambiguation)